The 1909–10 season was Stoke's second in the Birmingham & District League and the first in the Southern Football League.

Stoke decided to enter two league competitions this season with the directors feeling that the Southern Football League represented a better chance to be re-elected into the Football League. Stoke won the Southern Football League Division Two A with ease winning all ten of their matches and the Division Two championship play-off. They scored 48 goals conceding only 9, but promotion was not gained due to a league reorganization. The Birmingham & District League was a lot harder and Stoke finished in 7th place.

Season review

League
Stoke played in two league competitions during the 1909–10 season, in the Birmingham & District League and in the Southern League Division Two. This meant a total of 44 league fixtures would be played during the season.

The standard of football in the Southern League was of a poor quality and Stoke took the championship with ease, winning all of their 10 matches with a goal-average of 48-9. They started off with an 11–0 home victory over Merthyr Town and never looked back. On 25 April 1910, Stoke met Hastings & St Leonards United (winners of Division Two B) in a 'championship decider' and Stoke easily won 6–0 to claim the title.

The Birmingham league was considerably tougher and it was dominated by Aston Villa's reserve side. Stoke finished in 7th place, never threatening to challenge the leaders throughout the campaign. Arthur Griffiths, who had returned to the club from Oldham Athletic, top scored this season amassing 38 goals in all competitions.

FA Cup
The biggest crowd of the season at the Victoria Ground (18,000) came in the FA Cup first round against Newcastle United.  Stoke having progressed past Ilkeston and Exeter City in the qualifying rounds. Stoke held the Geordies to a 1–1 draw but lost 2–1 in the replay up in the north east and Newcastle went on to lift the cup. Stoke also played in the Birmingham League Cup for the one and only time losing to Aston Villa's second string in the third round.  The directors decided that the Birmingham League Cup was not a worthwhile competition to enter.

Final league table

Birmingham & District League

Southern Football League Division Two A

Results

Stoke's score comes first

Legend

Birmingham & District League

Southern Football League Division Two A

Division Two championship play-off

FA Cup

Birmingham League Cup

Squad statistics

References

Stoke City F.C. seasons
Stoke